

Historical bridges

Major bridges

References 
 

 Others references

See also 

 Transport in Panama

External links 
 

Panama

Bridges
b